Lake Road may refer to:

Lake Road (Western New York) in the United States
Vermilion Lake Road in Sudbury, Ontario, Canada
Lake Road in Taiping Lake Gardens Perak, Malaysia